Rongo or Rongo town is a town in Migori County, Kenya.It attracts lots of investors due to its massive gold mineral reserves since decades. As of 2009, it had a total population of 82,066 with 12,355 in the urban core.

Education

Rongo town is the home for Rongo University. Rongo University (RU), formerly Rongo University College, is a public university and was awarded Charter to full fledged university by H.E. Hon. Uhuru Kenyatta, the President of the Republic of Kenya on 7 October 2016. The University derives its mandate from the Rongo University Charter of 7 October 2016, which stipulates the objects and functions including teaching research and community service.

Rongo University (RU) is located 8 km outside Rongo town. It was formerly a constituent college of Moi University.  RU was founded in 2011. The site was formerly used as Moi Institute of Technology, established in 1981. Rongo is also home to St. Magdalene Teachers College.

References

External links
Rongo University

Populated places in Kenya
Migori County